The Society of Swedish Literature in Finland (abbr. SLS) is a scholarly society for the collection, archiving and dissemination of knowledge about Finland-Swedish culture. SLS publishes scholarly literature, maintains archives and libraries, funds research and awards literary and scholarly prizes and scholarships. SLS’s activity is made possible by private donations. SLS is one of the largest managers of private charitable funds in Finland.

SLS was established in 1885 in memory of the Finnish national poet Johan Ludvig Runeberg, during a time when it was felt that the Swedish language and Swedish culture in Finland were under threat from the Finnish side. Leading cultural figures endorsed the need for an organization to preserve and mediate the Swedish cultural heritage in Finland. At the same time they sought to strengthen the identity of the Swedish-speaking population, and its understanding of its own culture.

Today SLS has over 1,100 members, with around 100 employees in Helsinki and Vaasa.

Collector and mediator of material about Finland-Swedish culture 

The SLS archives are a rich source of knowledge about Swedish-speaking Finland, its history, traditions, literature, languages, everyday life and folk music. SLS documents contemporary society and accepts donations of cultural and historical material comprising everything from manuscripts and photographs to audio and video recordings, and maps.

SLS is making an increasing amount of its archive material available online. The material can be found on SLS’s own website, on the imaging site Flickr, in the EU’s digital library Europeana and at the Finnish search portal Finna, where the SLS union catalogue can be searched. The archive material that SLS publishes online is available for free use. The SLS archive also compiles teaching materials for schools.

Research 
The Society of Swedish Literature in Finland is the largest funder of Finland-Swedish-related research in the humanities and social sciences. Major areas of research include history, society, Swedish language, literature, ethnology, folklore and musicology.

SLS funds research projects conducted at universities or colleges. Each year SLS awards funds for 1–3 new projects. Cooperation with universities, research institutions and funding bodies in Finland and abroad is an important part of the Society’s activity. SLS organizes seminars and other events related to current research.

Publisher of scholarly literature

Overview
SLS publishes scholarly literature and nonfiction about Finland-Swedish culture, language, society, and history. SLS also specializes in scholarly editions of Finnish literary authors and publishes annotated critical editions of source documents such as letters, diaries and travel books. All publications undergo peer review.

Some 15 titles are published each year as part of the book series Skrifter utgivna av Svenska litteratursällskapet i Finland (Writing published by the Society of Swedish Literature in Finland).

Through cooperation with Swedish publishers the books reach readers in Sweden. Some titles are also published in translation. SLS also publishes folk music, both from its own archive collections and in collaboration with folk musicians.

Current major releases

 The Biografiskt Lexikon för Finland (Biographical Dictionary of Finland) was published between 2008 and 2011 and contains over 1600 biographies of persons in Finnish history, primarily those connected to Swedish-speaking Finland, as well as content translated from the Finnish-language Suomen kansallisbiografia.

 The letters and diaries of the Finnish Arabist G. A. Wallin (1811–1852) are being published in a critical and annotated edition.
 The poetry, prose, criticism and letters of the literary modernist Henry Parland (1908–1930) are being published in a critical edition.
 Zacharias Topelius (1818–1898) was a poet, short story writer, newspaper editor, social activist and professor of history. His extensive writings are a literary monument to nineteenth century Finland. The critical and annotated Zacharias Topelius Skrifter is the first complete edition of his works. It is being published digitally and is freely available. Selected writings will also be issued in print.

Prizes and scholarships 
SLS is one of the largest managers of private funds in Finland. The funds are created from donations and bequests. SLS owns and manages the Swedish Cultural Foundation in Finland (Svenska kulturfonden), which is one of the largest funds in Finland. The Society annually awards a number of grants and scholarships from the funds. Most of them are given to graduate students working in SLS’s fields of activity. The funds also support other activities in accordance with the donors’ wishes. Researchers whose mother tongue is not Swedish but are researching a topic that concerns Swedish-speaking Finland may apply to SLS for grants and scholarships.

SLS annually awards literary prizes to authors and researchers who write in Swedish.

The SLS Special Research Library 
The library in Helsinki specializes in literary and linguistic research as well as personal and cultural history, focusing on Swedish culture in Finland. The library contains several valuable antiquarian book collections as well as scholarly literature old and new.

In Vaasa there is a reference library with special emphasis on literature about local history, ethnology, folklore and folk music.

The library catalogue is available on the SLS website.

References

External links

 SLS's archive pictures on Flickr Commons
 Find the treasures of the SLS archives in the information search service Finna

Academic publishing
Finland Swedish
Finnish literature
Swedish-speaking population of Finland